Will to Power is the debut studio album by the American dance-pop band Will to Power. It was released in March 1988 by Epic Records. The album peaked at No. 68 on the Billboard 200 albums chart.

Will to Power contains the band's No. 1 song on the Billboard Hot 100 chart, "Baby, I Love Your Way/Freebird Medley", the most successful single released by them today, coming to stay for a week in the first position of the Billboard Hot 100, as well as two songs that reached No. 1 on the Billboard Hot Dance Club Play chart, ("Say It's Gonna Rain" that was the first single of them coming in the first position on the dance chart and "Fading Away" that reached first on the dance chart and achieved moderate success on the Billboard Hot 100). "Dreamin'" managed to enter the Billboard Hot 100 although it has achieved more success in the dance charts. According to Fred Bronson's 5th edition of The Billboard Book of #1 Hits, released in 2003, "Will to Power was a trio when the medley hit number one, consisting of (Bob) Rosenberg, (Suzi) Carr and a DJ known as Dr. J."

Track listing

Personnel

Will to Power
Vocals: Ale Lorenzo; Elin Michaels; Suzi Carr; Rachel Newman; April Newman; Betty Wright; Donna Allen; Lori Miller; Harry King and Dee Dee Wilde; and  Cirsten Steinhour
Bob Rosenberg: PKA: Will to Power: Vocals / Writer/ Producer * Signed exclusively through CBS Records 4/1987

Additional Musicians
Engineer and Mix Engineer: Mike Couzzi 
Keyboards & Programming: Lawrence Dermer; Winston Johnson; Lester Mendez; David Rosenthal; and Fro Sosa  
Guitar: Gary King
Turntables: David Hobbs
Post Production Edits: Kevin Fluornoy and Wayne Walters

Chart positions
Album - Billboard (United States)

Singles - Billboard (United States)

References

1988 debut albums
Will to Power (band) albums
Epic Records albums